In mathematics — specifically, in measure theory and functional analysis — the cylindrical σ-algebra or product σ-algebra is a type of σ-algebra which is often used when studying product measures or probability measures of random variables on Banach spaces.

For a product space, the cylinder σ-algebra is the one that is generated by cylinder sets.

See also

References

  (See chapter 2)

Banach spaces
Functional analysis
Measure theory